Gregory Phillips Architects is a London based architecture and interior design.

Background

Founded by Gregory Phillips in 1991. Phillips studied at Bristol University and the Mackintosh School of Architecture, before working with architects Julyan Wickham and David Chipperfield.

Based in London's Mayfair on Savile Row, Gregory Phillips Architects is a RIBA Chartered Practice. Gregory Phillips is also a member of the British Institute of Interior Design.

Projects
Refurbishment and remodelling

 Chelsea Harbour Apartment, Completed 2014
 Hertfordshire Listed Building, Completed 2013
 Carlton Hill, St Johns Wood, London Completed 2013
 Hyde Park Mews Completed 2012
 Totteridge Residence, Completed 2009
 Highbury Hill, Completed 2010

New build

 Berkshire, Detached Private Dwellings, completed 2011 and 2017
 Salisbury, Detached Private Dwelling, completed 2011
 Roehampton, Detached Private Dwelling, completed 2010
 Hyde Park, Mews House Private Dwelling, completed 2012
 Richmond, Detached Private Dwelling, completed 2007

Extension

 Wimbledon, Private Dwelling, Completed 2010
 Guildford, Private Dwelling, Completed 2009
 Kew, Private Dwelling, Completed 2011
 Sheen, Private Dwelling, Completed 2008
 Shoreditch, Apartments, Completed 2008
 Ware, Private Dwelling, Completed 2014

Interior design

 Berkshire Completed 2011
 Belsize Park, Apartment Remodelling, Conservation and refurbishment, Completed 2011
 Muswell Hill, Completed 2013

Awards and recognition
 RIBA Regional Award 2018 South Award Winner – Berkshire House
 RIBA Regional Award 2012 South/Southeast Downland Award Winner – Berkshire Residence
 International Design and Architecture Award Winner 2012 – Best Residential Property in Europe – Berkshire Residence
 Sunday Times British Homes Award 2012 Winner – Bespoke Luxury Living – Berkshire Residence
 Sunday Times British Home Award 2012 Architect of the Year – Finalist 
 RIBA Award 2010 Residential Category Finalist – Wimbledon Residence 
 Grand Designs 2010 Best Extension Finalist – Guildford Residence 
 Grand Designs 2010 Best Conversion Finalist – Shoreditch Penthouse 
 Grand Designs 2009 Best Extension Finalist – Muswell Hill Residence 
 Daily Telegraph H&R 2008 Best Extension/Remodel Winner – Muswell Hill Residence

Interior design awards

 Best Bathroom Designer of 2013 Homes & Garden Award 2013
 Sunday Times British Homes Award 2012 Association with the British Institute of Interior Design – Interior Design Winner – Berkshire
 International Property Award for Interior Design, Private House, South-East– Winner -Berkshire
 British Homes Award 2009 Best Interior Design UK Totteridge Residence
 Bentley International Property Awards 2005 Best Interior Design – 5 Star Winner- ‘World's Best’

Press and book coverage

 Britain's Best Architecture, Author: Gary Takle, Paperback 
 London Evening Standard Homes & Property 16 July 2014
 Living Etc. April 2014
 AJ Architects Journal 12 September 2012
 Architecture Foundation, New Architects 2
 Conde Design

References

Architecture firms based in London
Design companies established in 1991
1991 establishments in England